Pantnagar Airport  is a domestic airport serving Pantnagar, located in Udham Singh Nagar district in of Uttarakhand, India. It is operated by the Airports Authority of India. It is the nearest airport to the Kumaon division and is located in the middle of Haldwani and Rudrapur, the two largest cities of Kumaon. It is only (26 km) from Haldwani City. Kumaon hill stations of Nainital (65 km), Bhimtal (50 km), Ranikhet (110 km) and Almora (120 km), Bareilly (65 km) and the Jim Corbett National Park (120 km) are also nearby.

History 

The airport was able to accommodate only small aircraft until 2008, when the length of the runway was increased to 4,500 feet to accommodate larger turboprop aircraft at a cost of ₹75 crores.

The Government of Uttarakhand had offered a subsidy to Jagson Airlines between 2005 and 2008, to undertake daily scheduled flights between Pantnagar and Indira Gandhi International Airport, Delhi. The annual subsidy was not renewed in 2008 when the runway length was increased. The government then invited Deccan Aviation to fly on the Delhi – Pantnagar route. Kingfisher Airlines, which took over Deccan Aviation, undertook seasonal flights to Pantnagar as poor weather did not allow it to fly around the year. The airport had been without a commercial service ever since Kingfisher ceased operations. Pantnagar Airport now has daily Alliance Air flights to and from IGI, Delhi (since 1 October 2014), and an Air Heritage flight for Pithoragarh.

In August 2015, the Airport Advisory Committee said that the airport will be developed in cargo hub and the length of the runway would be increased from its present length of 1,372m to 1,865m.

The airport has had a facility of meteorological services by the India Meteorological Department since its inception.

Airlines and destinations

See also 

 List of airports in India

References 

Pantnagar
Airports in Uttarakhand
Airports with year of establishment missing